Himashree Roy is a female Indian Athlete who won a bronze medal in the 100 meters women's relay race along with Merlin K Joseph, Srabani Nanda and Dutee Chand in the 22nd Asian Athletics Championships which concluded on July 9, 2017. She was born in Kolkata, West Bengal on 15 March 1995.

Career 
She won the silver medal in women's 4x100m relay race along with N. Shardha, Sonal Chawla and Priyanka in the National Open athletics championships 2018  where they represented the Indian Railways.

Himashree Roy timed 11.60 seconds to set a record in women's 100 metres on 5 August 2018 in the 68th State Athletics Championships, at the Salt Lake Stadium while representing the Eastern Railway Sports Association (ERSA). She won the bronze medal in women's 100m final in 84th All India Railway Athletics Championship, 2017.

Himashree Roy, MG Padmini, Srabani Nanda and Gayathri Govindaraj won the bronze medal for women's 4x100m relay race in the second leg of the 2015 Asian Grand Prix Games, held in Thailand. She also won the gold medal in the women's 4×100 metre relay with teammates Dutee Chand, Srabani Nanda and Merlin K Joseph while representing the Indian Railways in the 55th National Open Athletic Championship, 2015.

References

1995 births
Sportswomen from West Bengal
Indian female sprinters
21st-century Indian women
21st-century Indian people
Living people